The Dream of Lieschen Mueller is a 1961 West German musical comedy film directed by Helmut Käutner and starring Sonja Ziemann, Martin Held and Cornelia Froboess.

It was made at the Spandau Studios in Berlin with sets designed by the art directors Hertha Hareiter and Otto Pischinger. It was shot in Eastmancolor.

Cast
Sonja Ziemann as Lieschen Müller
Martin Held as Dr. Schmidt
Cornelia Froboess as Anni
Helmut Griem as Jan
Peter Weck as Paul
Georg Thomalla as reporter
Wolfgang Neuss as chauffeur
Karl Schönböck as hotel manager
Bruno Fritz as Mayer, bank director
Jo Herbst as secretary #3
Herbert Weissbach as Bankpförtner
Ilse Pagé as Evchen
Hans Hessling as Uncle Joe
Heinrich Gies
Walter Giller as autograph hunter
Hardy Krüger as autograph hunter
Ruth Leuwerik as autograph hunter
Gene Reed as solo dancer
John Schapar as solo dancer
Constanze Vernon

References

External links

1961 musical comedy films
German musical comedy films
West German films
Films directed by Helmut Käutner
Films about dreams
Gloria Film films
Films shot at Spandau Studios
1960s German films